The 2015–16 Washington State Cougars men's basketball team represented Washington State University during the 2015–16 NCAA Division I men's basketball season. This was Ernie Kent's second year as head coach at Washington State. The Cougars played their home games at the Beasley Coliseum as members of the Pac-12 Conference. They finished the season 9–22, 1–17 in Pac-12 play to finish in last place. They lost in the first round of the Pac-12 tournament to Colorado.

Previous season 
The 2014–15 Cougars finished the season with an overall record of 13–18, and 7–11 in conference play. The Cougars lost to Cal in the First round of the Pac-12 Tournament.

Departures

Incoming transfers

2015 recruiting class

Roster

Schedule

Washington State's non-conference will include a trip to the Diamond Head Classic in Hawaii, where they will play three of the following: Auburn, BYU, Harvard, New Mexico, Northern Iowa, Oklahoma, and host-Hawaii. The Cougars will also host Gonzaga and UTEP.

|-
!colspan=9 style="background:#981E32; color:#FFFFFF;"| Exhibition

|-
!colspan=9 style="background:#981E32; color:#FFFFFF;"| Non-conference regular season

|-
!colspan=9 style="background:#981E32;"| Pac-12 regular season

|-
!colspan=9 style="background:#981E32;"| Pac-12 Tournament

References

Washington State Cougars
Washington State Cougars men's basketball seasons
Washington State
Washington State